Mazarefes was a civil parish in the municipality of Viana do Castelo, Portugal, with a population of 1 343 inhabitants (2011). Since 2013, it was merged with the parish of Vila Fria, forming Mazarefes e Vila Fria.

References 

Former parishes of Viana do Castelo